Valentin Ivanovich Bakulin (30 January 1945 – 24 February 2022) was a Russian politician. A member of the Communist Party of the Russian Federation, he served in the Federation Council from 2001 to 2004. He died in Ivanovo on 24 February 2022, at the age of 77.

References

1945 births
2022 deaths
20th-century Russian politicians
21st-century Russian politicians
Communist Party of the Russian Federation members
Communist Party of the Soviet Union members
Members of the Federation Council of Russia (after 2000)
Members of the Supreme Soviet of the Soviet Union
People from Ivanovo